Phacelia calthifolia (calthaleaf phacelia or caltha-leaved phacelia), is a flowering plant in the family Boraginaceae. It is native to the Mojave Desert in southeastern California and western Nevada, between Barstow, California, and the Death Valley area, where it occurs below 1,000 m in sandy soils.

It is an annual plant growing to 30 cm tall, with bristly stems. The leaves are dark green, rounded to heart-shaped with a notched base, 1–3 cm long and wide, with an entire or serrated margin. The flowers are bell-shaped, about 1 cm diameter, purple to violet in color.

Further reading
Mojave Desert Wildflowers, Jon Mark Stewart, 1998, pg. 152

External links
Phacelia calthifolia at Calflora
Jepson Flora Project: Phacelia calthifolia

calthifolia
Flora of the California desert regions
Flora of Nevada
Natural history of the Mojave Desert
Flora without expected TNC conservation status